Ladghar is a small village in Ratnagiri district, Maharashtra state in Western India. The 2011 Census of India recorded a total of 1,398 residents in the village. Just six kilometers from the famous Karde beach, is Ladghar, the home of adventure water sports in Ratnagiri. Water sports enthusiasts throng the beach in every season to experience the thrilling adventures that are organized at this beach in Konkan. Playing with the strong yet vigilant sea waves with the Banana ride, water scooters, and powerboat, gives one an alluring adrenaline rush. https://ratnagiritourism.in/en/beaches/ladghar-beach/

References

Villages in Ratnagiri district